Mahantesh Mallikarjun Kavatagimath is an Indian politician who served as the Chief whip of the Bharatiya Janata Party in Karnataka Legislative Council from 2 July 2018 up to 5 January 2022. He was elected from Belgaum Local Authorities in 2010 & 2016, twice in a row. He lost the election in 2022 after Lakhan Jarkiholi contested as an Independent and won.

References 

1966 births
Living people
Bharatiya Janata Party politicians from Karnataka